Aluthgama is a coastal town in Kalutara District in the Western Province of Sri Lanka. Aluthgama is situated on the southern bank of the Bentota Ganga (River) mouth.

The main income is from tourism and banking. It is the birthplace of the celebrated singer and composer Nanda Malini.

History
The history of Aluthgama dates back to the 13th century. A messenger poem, "Thisara Sandesha", written in 1366 mentions the beauty of Aluthgama.

Education
 Aluthgama Maha Vidyalaya ( Mix School) up to A/L
 Sangamiththa Balika (Ladies College) up to O/L only

Transport

Aluthgama is located on the Coastal or Southern Rail Line (connecting Colombo through to Matara). It is also located on the A2 highway, connecting Colombo to Wellawaya. Following the construction of the Southern Expressway (E01) between Colombo and Galle, Aluthgama has become an entrance point to the expressway from Galle Road (A2), via B157.

See also 
 Railway stations in Sri Lanka

References 

Populated places in Kalutara District